Rachel Tytler (born 25 June 1997) is a Scottish international judoka. She has represented Scotland at the Commonwealth Games and won a bronze medal.

Biography
Tytler educated at the University of Stirling won a bronze medal at the 2021 British Championships.

In 2022, she was selected for the 2022 Commonwealth Games in Birmingham, where she competed in the women's -78 kg category, winning the bronze medal.

References

1997 births
Living people
Scottish female judoka
British female judoka
Judoka at the 2022 Commonwealth Games
Commonwealth Games competitors for Scotland
Commonwealth Games bronze medallists for Scotland
Commonwealth Games medallists in judo
Medallists at the 2022 Commonwealth Games